Beach Head 2002 is a war game in which the player controls the defenses in a bunker to hold off an enemy assault.

Gameplay 
Taking control of the defenses of a bunker during an assault, the player utilises a variety of weapons to defeat their enemies, including airstrikes and other military equipment. Enemies arrive in stages to surround the player. Players can use different combat techniques, such as illuminating the field of battle, to defeat the enemies. One of the challenges of the games is shooting down aerial targets.  Some weapons are unavailable in certain stages.

Reception 
Metacritic, a review aggregator, rated the PC version of the game 46/100 based on five reviews.  Trey Walker of GameSpot wrote, "Beach Head 2002 delivers arcade-style shooting in its most basic—and repetitive—form."  Walker said the game "gets old quickly" and not an improvement over Beach Head 2000, though it is "visually pleasing". GameZone rated it 7/10 stars and praised the game's simplicity of design, though the reviewer said it "will appeal to a small niche of gamers" due to the lack of re-playability.  Tim Warner of Gamezilla rated it 47/100 and called it "a dismal attempt at a resurrection of an age-old favorite genre", criticizing the sluggish aiming, limited weapon choices, low-end graphics, and audio.  Reviewing the OS X version, Christopher Paretti of Inside Mac Games rated it 5.75/10 and wrote that it is fine for casual play during a break but recommended a more intellectual puzzle game instead.

See also 
 Beach Head 2000

References

External links 
 

2002 video games
Arcade video games
First-person shooters
Classic Mac OS games
Windows games
Shoot 'em ups
Infogrames games
War video games
MacSoft games
Video games developed in the United States
Single-player video games
Video game sequels
WizardWorks games